Atriplex glabriuscula, common names Scotland orache, smooth orache, Babington's orache or seaside orach  is an Atriplex species native to North America and northern Europe. It is an annual.

Conservation status in the United States
It is listed as a species of special concern in Connecticut and Rhode Island, and as endangered in New York (state).

References

glabriuscula
Flora of the United States
Flora of Malta